Grant Logan (born 1980) is a Scottish international lawn bowler.

Bowls career
Logan won the fours gold medal and pairs bronze medal at the 2011 Atlantic Bowls Championships.

Family
His father Gordon Logan, played in the English Football League for Port Vale. and his grandfather Rennie Logan won a silver medal at the 1972 World Outdoor Bowls Championship.

References

1979 births
Living people
Scottish male bowls players